The Midas Hotel and Casino is a casino hotel in Pasay, Metro Manila, Philippines.

History
The Midas Hotel and Casino opened in 1968. On February 1, 1971, the hotel became part of the Hyatt Hotel chain; the second Hyatt establishment outside the United States. It was owned by singer-songwriter Jose Mari Chan. The hotel was acquired by the Sunwest Group headed by Elizaldy Co and adopted its current name. The rebranded hotel had a soft opening on December 29, 2010.

Architecture and design
The hotel building was designed by National Artist for Architecture Leandro V. Locsin. It is of Modernist architecture with Filipino characteristics.

References

Hotels in Metro Manila
Buildings and structures in Pasay
Casinos in Metro Manila
Buildings and structures completed in 1968
Hyatt Hotels and Resorts
20th-century architecture in the Philippines